Machi is both a surname and a feminine Japanese given name. Notable people with the name include:

Surname:
Carmen Machi (born 1963), Spanish actor
Jean Machi (born 1983), Venezuelan major league baseball pitcher
Yūji Machi (born 1962), Japanese voice actor

Given name:
Ike Gyokuran (1727-1784), Japanese painter and poet whose birth name was Machi
Machi Tanaka (born 1983), Japanese long-distance runner

Japanese feminine given names
Japanese-language surnames